The sector, also known as a proportional compass or military compass, was a major calculating instrument in use from the end of the sixteenth century until the nineteenth century. It is an instrument consisting of two rulers of equal length joined by a hinge. A number of scales are inscribed upon the instrument which facilitate various mathematical calculations. It was used for solving problems in proportion, multiplication and division, geometry, and trigonometry, and for computing various mathematical functions, such as square roots and cube roots. Its several scales permitted easy and direct solutions of problems in gunnery, surveying and navigation. The sector derives its name from the fourth proposition of the sixth book of Euclid, where it is demonstrated that similar triangles have their like sides proportional. Some sectors also incorporated a quadrant, and sometimes a clamp at the end of one leg which allowed the device to be used as a gunner's quadrant.

History

The sector was invented, essentially simultaneously and independently, by a number of different people prior to the start of the 17th century.

Fabrizio Mordente (1532 – ca 1608) was an Italian mathematician who is best known for his invention of the "proportional eight-pointed compass" which has two arms with cursors that allow the solution of problems in measuring the circumference, area and angles of a circle. In 1567 he published a single sheet treatise in Venice showing illustrations of his device. In 1585 Giordano Bruno used Mordente's compass to refute Aristotle's hypothesis on the incommensurability of infinitesimals, thus confirming the existence of the "minimum" which laid the basis of his own atomic theory.

Credit for the invention is often given to either Thomas Hood, a British mathematician, or to the Italian mathematician and astronomer Galileo Galilei. Galileo, with the help of his personal instrument maker Marc'Antonio Mazzoleni, created more than 100 copies of his military compass design and trained students in its use between 1595 and 1598. Of the credited inventors, Galileo is certainly the most famous, and earlier studies usually attributed its invention to him.

The scales 
The following is a description of the instrument as it was constructed by Galileo, and for which he wrote a popular manual. The terminating values are arbitrary and varied from manufacturer to manufacturer.

The arithmetic lines

The innermost scales of the instrument are called the arithmetic lines from their division in arithmetical progression, that is, by equal additions which proceed out to the number 250. It is a linear scale generated by the function , where n is an integer between 1 and 250, inclusive, and L is the length at mark 250.

The geometric lines

The next scales are called the geometric lines and are divided out to 50 in lengths which vary as the square root of the labeled values.

The stereometric lines

The stereometric lines are so called because their divisions are according to the ratios of solid bodies, out to 148. One of this scale's applications is to calculate, when given one edge of any solid body, the corresponding edge of a similar one that has a given volume ratio to the first.

The metallic lines

These give the ratios and differences of specific weights of the materials. With the instrument set at any opening, the intervals between any correspondingly marked pair of points indicate the diameters of balls (or sides of other solid bodies) similar to one another and equal in weight.

The polygraphic lines

From the given information, the side length and the number of sides, the polygraphic lines yield the radius of the circle that will contain the required regular polygon. If the polygon required has n sides, then the central angle opposite one side will be 360/n.

The tetragonic lines

Tetragonic lines are so called from their principal use, which is to square all regular areas and the circle as well. The divisions of this scale use the function , between the values of 3 and 13.

The added lines

These added lines are marked with two series of numbers, of which the outer series begins near the outer end at a certain mark "D" (a semicircle symbol, not the capital letter D), which is followed (going inward) by the numbers 1, 2, 3, 4, and so on to 18. The inner series begins from another mark "□" (a square symbol) at the outer end, proceeding inward to 1, 2, 3, 4, and so on also to 18. These lines were used in conjunction with the other scales for a number of complex calculations.

Use 

The instrument can be used to graphically solve questions of proportion and relies on the principle of similar triangles. Its vital feature is a pair of jointed legs, which carry paired geometrical scales. In use, problems are set up using a pair of dividers to determine the appropriate opening of the jointed legs, and the answer is taken off directly as a dimension using the dividers. Specialised scales for area, volume and trigonometrical calculations, as well as simpler arithmetical problems, were quickly added to the basic design.

Different versions of the instrument also took different forms and adopted additional features. The type publicised by Hood was intended for use as a surveying instrument and included not only sights and a mounting socket for attaching the instrument to a pole or post, but also an arc scale and an additional sliding leg. Galileo's earliest examples were intended to be used as gunner's levels, as well as calculating devices.

Bibliography
 Galilei, Galileo, Operations of the Geometric and Military Compass, 1606. Translated with an introduction by Stillman Drake. The Burndy Library, published by The Dibner Library of the History of Science and Technology of the Smithsonian Institution and The Smithsonian Institution Press, Washington, D.C. 1978.
 Galilei, Galileo, Le Operazioni del Compasso Geometrico et Militare, third edition, Padua 1649. Scan available at the Internet Archive.
 Ralf Kern: Wissenschaftliche Instrumente in ihrer Zeit. Vom 15. – 19. Jahrhundert. Verlag der Buchhandlung Walther König 2010,

References

 A typical sector and how to use it
 The Scales of the Galilean Sector quotations from: "The Geometric and Military Compass” by G. Galilei (archived 2008)
 Cole Military Sector at the IBM Archives

Galileo Galilei
Mechanical calculators
Italian inventions